Project Runway: Threads is a spin-off series based on Project Runway. It premiered October 23, 2014 on Lifetime. This reality program features skilled teen and tween fashion designers.

Each week, three new young designers compete for a prize package worth over $25,000. The prizes will include $10,000 to be used at any Jo-Ann Fabrics and Crafts Store or joann.com; a scholarship to the summer program at Fashion Institute of Design & Merchandising in Los Angeles, including travel expenses; a top-of-the-line sewing and embroidery studio courtesy of Brother International Corporation and the winning designer's look will appear in Seventeen.

Host and Judges
The host is Vanessa Simmons, who also serves as a judge. She is joined by regular judges Christian Siriano (Project Runway Season 4 winner) and Ingrid Nilsen, a YouTube vlogger known as "Missglamorazzi." In addition, there are one or two guest judges each episode.

Format
Each episode begins with a “Show Us Your Style Challenge,” where the three competitors reveal a look, designed and sewn in advance, which showcases their personal aesthetic. The winner of this initial challenge earns an advantage over their adversaries. The designers bring an adult assistant to help them complete their challenges—the primary one and another called the "Surprise Door Twist." The Surprise Door Twist is to reimagine a white dress. The designers have unlimited access to the Jo-Ann Fabric Room and the Brother Sewing and Embroidery Studio.

Season 1 (2014)

Episode 1: Red Carpet 
Original airdate: October 23, 2014

Challenge: Create a red carpet look that shows off each designer's individual style.
Surprise Door Twist: Design a “Street Style” dress.
Contestants: (Name - Age - Hometown - Adult Design Assistant)
Bradford - 13 - Birmingham, AL - mother Dana
Cambria - 13 - West Hills, CA - father David
Kenzie - 12 - Portland, OR - mother Molly
Guest Judges: Kelly Osbourne, Jaime King 
WINNER: Bradford

Episode 2: Fashion Capitals 
Original airdate:  October 30, 2014

Challenge: Create a look which could be worn on the runway in one of three capitals of fashion—Paris, Tokyo, and New York City.
Surprise Door Twist: Design a dress inspired by contestants' hometowns.
Contestants: (Name - Age - Hometown - Adult Design Assistant - Fashion Capital)
Aliyah Royale - 14 - Valley Glen, CA - mother Tanya - Paris
Grace - 15 - La Cañada, CA - mother Peggy - New York City
Grayson - 14 - New Orleans, LA - grandmother Sirje - Tokyo
Guest Judge: Jasmine Snow (Senior Fashion Editor, Seventeen Magazine)
 WINNER: Grace

Episode 3: The Ultimate Accessory 
Original airdate: November 6, 2014

Challenge: Create a look inspired by designer statement pieces—a jeweled headpiece by Rodrigo Otazu, a clutch by Vivienne Westwood, shoes by Alexander McQueen or a vintage Chanel handbag.
Surprise Door Twist: Design a dress using only fabric paint to showcase themselves as designers.
Contestants: (Name - Age - Hometown - Adult Design Assistant - Designer Statement Piece)
Colette - 15 - Chicago, IL - mother Jill - handbag
Emily- 15 - Quincy, MA - father David - clutch
Zachary - 15 - Berkeley, CA - mother Camille - jeweled headpiece (Zachary, in 2015 was a contestant on Project Runway: Junior)
Guest Judge: Gina Kelly (Fashion Director, Seventeen Magazine)
 WINNER: Zachary

Episode 4: Pop Star 
Original airdate: November 13, 2014

Challenge: Create look suitable for their favorite pop star: Katy Perry, Lady Gaga and Florence Welch.
Surprise Door Twist: Design a dress for their favorite pop star using only unconventional materials from the craft section of a Jo-Ann Fabrics and Crafts Store. 
Contestants: (Name - Age - Hometown - Adult Design Assistant - Favorite Pop Star)
Brianna - 13 - Ventura, CA - mother Lori - Florence Welch
Claire - 13 - Braintree, MA - mother Kristen - Katy Perry
Matt - 16 - Manhattan Beach, CA - grandmother Dorothy - Lady Gaga (Matt, in 2016 was a contestant on Project Runway: Junior)
Guest Judge: Zendaya
 WINNER: Brianna

Episode 5: Prom 
Original airdate: November 20, 2014

Challenge: Create a prom look that shows off each designer's individual style.
Surprise Door Twist: Design a dress using only unconventional materials - flowers. 
Contestants: (Name - Age - Hometown - Adult Design Assistant)
Bella - 12 - Manhattan Beach, CA - grandmother Nancy 
Kimanni - 13 - Atlanta, GA - mother Rochelle
Tieler - 14 - New Orleans, LA - mother Tahmi  (Tieler, in 2016 was a contestant on Project Runway: Junior)
Guest Judge: Gina Kelly (Fashion Director, Seventeen Magazine)
 WINNER: Tieler

Episode 6: Monster Mash Up 
Original airdate: December 4, 2014

Challenge: Create a look of two monsters mashed together for inspiration.
Surprise Door Twist: Design a dress using only unconventional materials- candy
Contestants: (Name - Age - Hometown - Adult Design Assistant)
Ciara - 10 - LA, California - mother Tammy
Katie - 11 - Huntington Beach, CA  - mother Rosette
Lucas - 12 - Orlando, FL - father Nick
Guest Judge: Jasmine Snow (senior fashion editor for Seventeen magazine)
WINNER: Katie

Episode 7: Cover Look 
Original airdate: December 11, 2014

Challenge: Create a Seventeen Magazine cover look.
Surprise Door Twist: Utilize a white dress, drawstring, sequin trim, purple dye, blue fabric, and fringe. 
Contestants: (Name - Age - Hometown - Adult Design Assistant)
Alex - 16 - West Covina, CA - father Voislav 
Julia - 15 - Lafayette, CA - mother Karin
Molly - 16 - Washington, CT - mother Patricia
Guest Judge: Gina Kelly (Fashion Director, Seventeen Magazine)
 WINNER: Julia

Episode 8: Showstopper 
Original airdate: December 18, 2014

Challenge: Create a showstopping finale runway look.
Surprise Door Twist: Design an opening look to go with the finale look. 
Contestants: (Name - Age - Hometown - Adult Design Assistant)
Mady - 14 - Stover, MO - mother Tracey
Christopher - 14 - Tuzcon, AZ - grandmother Zinda
Zoe - 15 - Colchester, CT - father Louie
Guest Judge: Jaime King 
 WINNER: Zoe

International broadcast
The series premiered in Australia on June 7, 2015 on Arena.

References

External links
Project Runway: Threads Official Website

2010s American reality television series
2014 American television series debuts
2014 American television series endings
2014 in fashion
2014 American television seasons
American television spin-offs
English-language television shows
Lifetime (TV network) original programming
Project Runway (American series)
Reality television spin-offs
Television series about teenagers
Television series by The Weinstein Company